NewsON is a local news service that enables users to see live and on demand local news broadcasts and video clips from TV stations across the United States in one app. As of February 2021, NewsON includes over 275 TV stations from over 160 markets covering more than 75% of the US population.

The app is available on mobile phones, tablets and connected TVs, including iPhones, iPads, Android phones, Android tablets, Roku connected TV devices, Fire TV and Apple TV. NewsON also offers a web streaming site. NewsON delivers a first-of-its-kind app to view live local news broadcasts during breaking news across platforms and enabling viewers to watch the video when convenient for them.

NewsON was announced on June 9, 2015, as a venture formed by five of the largest TV station groups in the United States. The founding members are ABC Owned Television Stations, Cox Media Group, Hearst Television, Media General, and Raycom Media. Hubbard Broadcasting announced its participation as an investor in November 2015, and Sinclair Broadcast Group announced their investment in January 2016.

Current participating station groups are Berkshire Hathaway, Block Communications, CBS News and Stations, Cowles Company, Cox Media Group, the E. W. Scripps Company, Fort Myers Broadcasting Company, Forum Communications, Hearst Television, Heritage Broadcasting Company, Hubbard Broadcasting, McKinnon Broadcasting, Morgan Murphy Media, Sinclair Broadcast Group and Tegna Inc.

The company launched service to the public on November 4, 2015 on iOS, Android, and Roku. Viewers can share what they’ve seen on social platforms such as Facebook or Twitter.

On January 1, 2020, ABC Owned Television Station Group removed their eight stations from the service.

In fall of 2021, Gray Television removed their stations from NewsON in favor of VUit.

See also
 Haystack News
 Local Now
 VUit

References

 NewsON Platform Expands with Launch of Local News Video Browser Experience

External links

List of available local news stations on NewsON

American news websites